Epipristis transiens is a moth of the family Geometridae first described by Sterneck in 1927. It is found in the Chinese provinces of Beijing, Shanxi, Henan, Shaanxi and Ningxia.

The length of the forewings is 15–16 mm for males and 16–18 mm for females. The wings are greyish white, suffused with blackish scales.

References

Moths described in 1927
Pseudoterpnini